Grantham Sound is a bay on East Falkland, Falkland Islands, which opens out into the Falkland Sound. At its landward end, it narrows and becomes Brenton Loch (sometimes included as a part of it). Mount Usborne overlooks it.

Along with San Carlos Water, it is one of the proposed sites for the East Falkland terminal for the anticipated ferry to West Falkland.

References

East Falkland
Straits of the Falkland Islands